Reginald William Maxwell Bowder was Dean of Lismore from 1987 to 1989.

Bowder was ordained in 1981. Also a journalist, he has been chaplain to the University of Kent and an associate priest at Rotherfield Greys. He served as  Rector of Donoughmore, Donard and Dunlavin. 

In 2015 he became a Roman Catholic.

References

Deans of Lismore
Living people
20th-century Irish Anglican priests
21st-century Irish Anglican priests
Anglican priest converts to Roman Catholicism
Year of birth missing (living people)